Bjørnestad is a village in Sirdal municipality in Agder county, Norway. The village is known for the Bjørnestad Skisenter skiing resort.

Bjørnestad Skisenter
The village is known for its small ski resort. The resort has one T-bar lift that pulls skiers  up a mountain. Although very small, it has got some great skiing terrain for more experienced skiers. The slope is about 37% steep on average, which makes it the steepest ski resort in Sirdal. Bjørnestad Skisenter uses this fact in their slogan:  (English: "Steepest in Sirdal").

References

Ski areas and resorts in Norway
Sport in Agder
Villages in Agder
Sirdal